Van Buitenen is a surname. Notable people with the surname include:

 J. A. B. van Buitenen (1928–1979), Dutch Indologist
 Paul van Buitenen (born 1957), Dutch politician and civil servant

Dutch-language surnames
Surnames of Dutch origin